Fabienne Chaudat (born 1 July 1959) is a French film and theatrical actress.

Career
Fabienne Chaudat attended the and then Jean-Laurent Cochet's classes, before starting her career.

Theater

Filmography

References

External links

French film actresses
French stage actresses
20th-century French actresses
21st-century French actresses
Living people
1959 births